Der var engang is a 1966 Danish family film directed by John Price and starring Birgitte Bruun.

Cast
 Birgitte Bruun - Prinsessen af Illyrien
 Hans W. Petersen - Kongen af Illyrien
 Peter Steen - Prinsen af Danmark
 Ove Sprogøe - Første frier
 Gunnar Lauring - Anden frier
 Preben Lerdorff Rye - Første junker
 Hardy Rafn - Anden junker
 Vigga Bro - Sisse, køkkenpige
 Kai Holm - Kulsvier
 Gerda Madsen - Kvinde på markedsplads
 Edouard Mielche - Ceremonimester
 Henry Nielsen - Gøgler
 Dirch Passer - Kasper Røghat
 Sisse Reingaard - Hofdame
 Grethe Sønck - Fadebursterne
 Volmer Sørensen - Kok
 Cleo Jensen - Kokkepige
 Ulrik Neumann - Banjospiller

References

External links

1966 films
Danish children's films
1960s Danish-language films
Films directed by John Price
Holger Drachmann